The Million Dollar Countdown (also known as L'assalto al centro nucleare) is a 1967 Spanish-Italian criminal comedy film  directed by Mario Caiano and starring Frank Wolff.

Cast  
 Frank Wolff as  Brian Kervin
 Rossella Como as Claudine  
 Giampiero Albertini as Joe
 Claudio Gora as Proprietario del Yacht
 Gérard Landry as Colonel 
 Toni Ucci as Theo
 Thea Fleming as Huguette
 Jesús Puente as Talbol
 Josyane Gibert as Fiamma  
 Pippo Starnazza as Zero
 Aldo Bufi Landi 	
 Amedeo Trilli

Reception

References

External links

Spanish crime comedy films
1960s crime comedy films
Films directed by Mario Caiano
Italian crime comedy films
1967 comedy films
1967 films
1960s Italian films
1960s Spanish films